is a Japanese light novel series written by Rokujūyon Okazawa and illustrated by Sage Joh. It was serialized online via the user-generated novel publishing website Shōsetsuka ni Narō from November 2018 to July 2020. It was later acquired by Kodansha, who have published three volumes since August 2019 under their Kodansha Ranobe Books imprint.

A manga adaptation by Rurekuchie was serialized in Kodansha's seinen manga magazine Young Magazine the 3rd from August 2019 to April 2021, and transferred to Monthly Young Magazine in May 2021. It has been collected into nine tankōbon volumes as of March 2023. An anime television series adaptation by Encourage Films premiered in January 2023.

Plot
Dariel is a soldier serving the demon army as aide to the demon lord Bashvaza, until he is fired by him. Having nowhere to go, Dariel sets out into the world when he saves the human girl Marika and is invited to her village. While things become worse in the demon army due to Dariel's absence, Dariel gets used to life among humans but is conflicted with his demon upbringing, as human and demon society have been at war for centuries.

Characters

Media

Light novel
Written by Rokujūyon Okazawa, Chillin' in My 30s After Getting Fired from the Demon King's Army was published online via the Shōsetsuka ni Narō website from November 15, 2018, to July 30, 2020. Kodansha acquired the series, and began publishing it with illustrations by Sage Joh on August 2, 2019, under their Kodansha Ranobe Books imprint. As of March 2020, three volumes have been published.

Manga
A manga adaptation by Rurekuchie began serialization in Kodansha's Young Magazine the 3rd on August 6, 2019. The series moved to Monthly Young Magazine on May 20, 2021. As of March 2023, nine tankōbon volumes have been published.

Anime
An anime television series adaptation was announced in July 2022. The series is produced by Encourage Films and directed by Fumitoshi Oizaki, with assistant direction by Yoshihide Yūzumi, scripts written by Hitomi Amamiya, character designs handled by Satomi Yonezawa, and music composed by Tsubasa Ito. It premiered on January 7, 2023, on Tokyo MX and other networks. The opening theme song is "Changemaker" by Hinano, while the ending theme song is "Dear Doze Days" by Akari Kitō. Crunchyroll licensed the series outside of Asia.

Notes

References

External links
  at Shōsetsuka ni Narō 
  
  
 

2019 Japanese novels
2023 anime television series debuts
Anime and manga based on light novels
Crunchyroll anime
Encourage Films
Fantasy anime and manga
Japanese fantasy novels
Kodansha books
Kodansha manga
Light novels
Light novels first published online
Seinen manga
Shōsetsuka ni Narō
Tokyo MX original programming